Dublin County was a parliamentary constituency in Ireland, which returned two Members of Parliament (MPs) to the House of Commons of the Parliament of the United Kingdom.

The constituency was created under the Act of Union 1800, replacing the Dublin County constituency in the Parliament of Ireland.  For the 1885 general election, it was replaced with two new county divisions, Dublin County South and Dublin County North.

Boundaries
This constituency comprised the whole of County Dublin, except for the Dublin borough constituency (which was separately represented). The borough comprised the whole of the county of the city of Dublin and the portion of the county at large within the Circular Road (see Dublin City (UK Parliament constituency) for further details.

A Topographical Directory of Ireland, published in 1837, describes some aspects of the Parliamentary history of the county.

Two knights of the shire are returned to the Imperial parliament, who are elected at the county court-house at Kilmainham : the number of electors registered under the 2d of William IV., c. 88, up to Feb. 1st, 1837, is 2728, of which 788 were £50, 407 £20, and 622 £10, freeholders; 18 £50, 427 £20, and 423 £10, leaseholders; and 12 £50, 30 £20, and 1 £10, rent-chargers : the number that voted at the last general election was 1480. Prior to the Union, the boroughs of Swords and Newcastle sent each two members to the Irish House of Commons.

Members of Parliament

Elections

Elections in the 1880s

Elections in the 1870s

 Caused by Taylor's appointment as Chancellor of the Duchy of Lancaster.

Elections in the 1860s

 

 5829

 Caused by Hamilton's resignation.

Elections in the 1850s

 Caused by Taylor's appointment as a Lord Commissioner of the Treasury

Elections in the 1840s

Elections in the 1830s

Notes

References
The Parliaments of England by Henry Stooks Smith (1st edition published in three volumes 1844–50), 2nd edition edited (in one volume) by F.W.S. Craig (Political Reference Publications 1973)

External links
Part of the Library Ireland: Irish History and Culture website containing the text of A Topographical Directory of Ireland, by Samuel Lewis (a work published by S. Lewis & Co of London in 1837) including an article on County Dublin

Westminster constituencies in County Dublin (historic)
Constituencies of the Parliament of the United Kingdom established in 1801
Constituencies of the Parliament of the United Kingdom disestablished in 1885